Sylvester E. (Sid) Flanagan (September 26, 1909 – February 1, 1990) was an American politician in the state of Washington. He served in the Washington House of Representatives from 1961 to 1983.

References

1990 deaths
1909 births
Republican Party members of the Washington House of Representatives
20th-century American politicians